Bolbomyia is a genus of snipe flies, and the sole genus in the family Bolbomyiidae; until 2010, it was placed in the family Rhagionidae. They are a small 2 to 3.5 mm, brown or black in color, with lightly infuscate (darkened) wings. They are restricted to the north temperate region of North America and Russian Far East (Kamchatka).

Species
†B. loewi Meunier, 1902 - fossil Baltic
B. melanderi Chillcott, 1963 - Nearctic
B. nana Loew, 1862 - Nearctic
B. wuorentausi (Szilády, 1934) - Russia

References

Rhagionoidea

Brachycera genera
Diptera of Asia
Diptera of North America
Taxa named by Hermann Loew